Alston Sidney Muziyo (born 12 November 1954) is a Zambian sprinter. He competed in the men's 200 metres at the 1980 Summer Olympics.

References

1954 births
Living people
Athletes (track and field) at the 1980 Summer Olympics
Zambian male sprinters
Olympic athletes of Zambia
Place of birth missing (living people)